The Midland Colts were a West Texas League baseball team based in Midland, Texas, United States that played from 1928 to 1929. They were the first of many professional baseball teams to come out of Midland, Texas.

Notable players include Bob Boken and Gene Moore.

References

Baseball teams established in 1928
Baseball teams disestablished in 1929
Defunct minor league baseball teams
1928 establishments in Texas
1929 disestablishments in Texas
Defunct baseball teams in Texas
Sports in Midland, Texas